Hyderabadi biryani (also known as Hyderabadi dum biryani) is a style of biryani originating from Hyderabad, India made with basmati rice and meat (mostly mutton). Originating in the kitchens of the Nizam of Hyderabad, it combines elements of Hyderabadi and Mughlai cuisines. Hyderabad biryani is a key dish in Hyderabadi cuisine and it is so famous that the dish is considered synonymous with the city of Hyderabad.

History
Hyderabad was conquered by the Mughals in the 1630s, and ruled by its Nizams. Mughlai culinary traditions joined with local traditions to create Hyderabadi cuisine.  Local folklore attributes the creation of Hyderabadi biryani to the chef of the first Nizam, Nizam-ul-Mulk, Asaf Jah I, in the mid-18th century, during a hunting expedition. In 1857, when the Mughal Empire declined in Delhi, Hyderabad emerged as the center of South Asian culture, resulting in a mix of innovations in Hyderabadi biryani.

Origin
The exact origin of the dish is uncertain. Despite legends attributing it to the Nizam's chef, the biryani is of South Indian origin, derived from pilaf varieties brought to South Asia by Arab traders. Pulao may have been an army dish in medieval India. Armies would prepare a one-pot dish of rice with whichever meat was available. The distinction between "pulao" and "biryani" is arbitrary. Hyderabadi Biryani developed engrossing Deccani or Telangana flavors into it, as stated by the Himayat Ali Mirza, the great-grandson of Mir Osman Ali Khan. Himayat said that this evolution had taken place in the Asaf Jah’s Kitchen.

Ingredients

Base ingredients are basmati rice, goat meat or (sometime chicken or beef), dahi, fried onion and ghee. Spices include cinnamon, cloves, cardamom (elaichi), bay leaves, nutmeg, papaya paste, caraway (shahi jeera), mace flower (javitri), star anise (biryani flower), lemon, and saffron.

Hyderabadi biryani is of two types: the kachchi (raw) biryani, and the pakki (cooked) biryani.

Kachch-e-gosht ki biryani
The kachchi biryani is prepared with kachchi gosht (raw meat) marinated with spices overnight and then soaked in curd (dahi) before cooking. The meat is sandwiched between layers of fragrant basmati rice and cooked "in dum" after sealing the handi (vessel) with dough. This is a challenging process as it requires meticulous attention to time and temperature to avoid over- or under-cooking the meat.

Accompaniments
A biryani is usually served with dahi chutney and mirchi ka salan. Baghaar-e-baingan is a common side dish. The salad includes onion, carrot, cucumber, and lemon wedges.

See also

 Hyderabadi cuisine
 Hyderabadi haleem

References

Further reading
 A Princely Legacy, Hyderabadi Cuisine by Pratibha Karan. , 
 Elegant East Indian and Hyderabadi Cuisine by Asema Moosavi. 
 The Hindu: Hyderabadi Biryani popularity and its variants
 The Story of Biryani: How This Exotic Dish Came, Saw and Conquered India!

External links
 

Indian rice dishes
Hyderabadi cuisine
Telangana cuisine
Goat dishes
Indian cuisine